Lithocarpus brochidodromus is a tree in the beech family Fagaceae. The specific epithet  is from the Latin meaning "loop-veined", referring to the leaves.

Description
The flaky bark is greyish or brownish. The flowers are solitary on the rachis.

Distribution and habitat
Lithocarpus brochidodromus is endemic to Borneo. Its habitat is mixed dipterocarp forests, including along rivers, to  altitude.

References

brochidodromus
Endemic flora of Borneo
Trees of Borneo
Plants described in 1998
Flora of the Borneo lowland rain forests